Menathais tuberosa, common names humped rock shell, humped rocksnail, is a species of sea snail, a marine gastropod mollusk, of the family Muricidae, the murex snails or rock snails.

Description
The size of an adult shell varies between 17 mm and 50 mm.

Distribution
This species occurs in the Indian Ocean off Madagascar and Tanzania; also in the southwestern and central Pacific Ocean off Tonga

References

 Dautzenberg, Ph. (1929). Mollusques testacés marins de Madagascar. Faune des Colonies Francaises, Tome III
 Spry, J.F. (1961). The sea shells of Dar es Salaam: Gastropods. Tanganyika Notes and Records 56
 Lamy, Ed., 1918. Notes sur quelques espèces de Purpura déterminées par Blainville dans la collection du Muséum de Paris. Bulletin du Muséum national d'Histoire naturelle 24: 352-357
 Claremont M., Vermeij G.J., Williams S.T. & Reid D.G. (2013) Global phylogeny and new classification of the Rapaninae (Gastropoda: Muricidae), dominant molluscan predators on tropical rocky seashores. Molecular Phylogenetics and Evolution 66: 91–102

External links
 Röding, P.F. (1798). Museum Boltenianum sive Catalogus cimeliorum e tribus regnis naturæ quæ olim collegerat Joa. Fried Bolten, M. D. p. d. per XL. annos proto physicus Hamburgensis. Pars secunda continens Conchylia sive Testacea univalvia, bivalvia & multivalvia. Trapp, Hamburg. viii, 199 pp
 Blainville, H. M. D. de. (1832). Disposition méthodique des espèces récentes et fossiles des genres Pourpre, Ricinule, Licorne et Concholépas de M. de Lamarck, et description des espèces nouvelles ou peu connues, faisant partie de la collection du Muséum d'Histoire Naturelle de Paris. Nouvelles Annales du Muséum d'Histoire Naturelle. 1: 189-263, pls 9-12

tuberosa
Gastropods described in 1798